Otto Schiff (26 April 1892 – 9 July 1978) was a Dutch fencer. He competed in the team foil event at the 1928 Summer Olympics.

References

1892 births
1978 deaths
Dutch male fencers
Olympic fencers of the Netherlands
Fencers at the 1928 Summer Olympics
Sportspeople from Surabaya